The 2005 NCAA Division I men's ice hockey tournament involved 16 schools playing in single-elimination play to determine the national champion of men's NCAA Division I college ice hockey. It began on March 25, 2005, and ended with the championship game on April 9. A total of 15 games were played.

This tournament marked the first time in NCAA history, in any Division, in any sport, male or female, that the 4 semi-finalists all hailed from the same conference. The University of Denver, Colorado College, University of Minnesota, and University of North Dakota were all members of the Western Collegiate Hockey Association (WCHA).

Game locations

The NCAA Men's Division I Ice Hockey Championship is a single-elimination tournament featuring 16 teams representing all six Division I conferences in the nation.  The Championship Committee seeds the entire field from 1 to 16 within four regionals of 4 teams. The winners of the six Division I conference championships receive automatic bids to participate in the NCAA Championship. Regional placements are based primarily on the home location of the top seed in each bracket with an attempt made to put the top-ranked teams close to their home site.

Regional Sites
 East — DCU Center, Worcester, Massachusetts
 Midwest — Van Andel Arena, Grand Rapids, Michigan
 Northeast — Mullins Center, Amherst, Massachusetts
 West — Mariucci Arena, Minneapolis, Minnesota

Frozen Four
 Value City Arena, Columbus, Ohio (host: Ohio State University)

Qualifying teams
The at-large bids and seeding for each team in the tournament was announced on March 20, 2005. The Western Collegiate Hockey Association (WCHA) had five teams receive a berth in the tournament, Hockey East had four teams receive a berth in the tournament, the ECACHL had three teams receive a berth in the tournament, the Central Collegiate Hockey Association (CCHA) had two teams receive a berth in the tournament, while Atlantic Hockey and College Hockey America (CHA) both received a single bid for their tournament champions.

Number in parentheses denotes overall seed in the tournament.

Game locations

First round and regional finals
 East – DCU Center, Worcester, Massachusetts
 Midwest – Van Andel Arena, Grand Rapids, Michigan
 Northeast – William D. Mullins Center, Amherst, Massachusetts
 West – Mariucci Arena, Minneapolis, Minnesota

Frozen Four
 Value City Arena, Columbus, Ohio (host: Ohio State University)

Brackets

East Regional

West Regional

Midwest Regional

Northeast Regional

Frozen Four

Note: * denotes overtime period(s)

East Regional

Regional semifinals

(1) Boston College vs. (4) Mercyhurst

(2) North Dakota vs. (3) Boston University

Regional Finals

(1) Boston College vs. (2) North Dakota

Midwest Regional

Regional semifinals

(1) Colorado College vs. (4) Colgate

(2) Michigan vs. (3) Wisconsin

Regional Final

(1) Colorado College vs. (2) Michigan

Northeast Regional

Regional semifinals

(1) Denver vs. (4) Bemidji State

(2) New Hampshire vs. (3) Harvard

Regional Finals

(1) Denver vs. (2) New Hampshire

West Regional

Regional semifinals

(1) Minnesota vs. (4) Maine

(2) Cornell vs. (3) Ohio State

Regional Final

(1) Minnesota vs. (2) Cornell

Frozen Four

National semifinal

(W1) Minnesota vs. (E2) North Dakota

(NE1) Denver vs. (MW1) Colorado College

National Championship

(NE1) Denver vs. (E2) North Dakota

All-Tournament team
G: Peter Mannino* (Denver)
D: Brett Skinner (Denver)
D: Matt Carle (Denver)
F: Paul Stastny (Denver)
F: Travis Zajac (North Dakota)
F: Gabe Gauthier (Denver)
* Most Outstanding Player(s)

Record by conference

References

Tournament
NCAA Division I men's ice hockey tournament
NCAA Division I men's ice hockey tournament
NCAA Division I men's ice hockey tournament
NCAA Division I men's ice hockey tournament
NCAA Division I men's ice hockey tournament
NCAA Division I men's ice hockey tournament
NCAA Division I men's ice hockey tournament
2000s in Minneapolis
21st century in Columbus, Ohio
Events in Grand Rapids, Michigan
Ice hockey competitions in Worcester, Massachusetts
Sports competitions in Columbus, Ohio
Ice hockey competitions in Michigan
Ice hockey competitions in Minneapolis
Sports in Amherst, Massachusetts
Sports in Grand Rapids, Michigan